Kordali (Kurdali), or Palai, is one of the Kurdish languages. It is often included in Southern Kurdish, but is quite distinct. It is spoken by the large Kordali tribe in the borderlands between Iraq and Iran.

Geography 
It is principally spoken in parts of Ilam Province in Iran including in Abdanan, Dehloran, Meymeh and Pahleh. In Iraq, the dialect is spoken in Ali Al-Gharbi and Shayk Sa'd in Wasit Governorate.

See also
Posht Tang-e Kordali

References

Kurdish language
Languages of Kurdistan
Fa:گویش کردلی